The Massachusetts Maritime Buccaneers football team represents Massachusetts Maritime Academy in college football at the NCAA Division III level. The Buccaneers are members of the Massachusetts State Collegiate Athletic Conference (MASCAC), fielding its team in the MASCAC since 2013. The Buccaneers play their home games at Clean Harbors Stadium in Buzzards Bay, Massachusetts. 

Their head coach is Jeremy Cameron, who took over the position for the 2005 season.

Conference affiliations
 New England Football Conference (1973–2012)
 Massachusetts State Collegiate Athletic Conference (2013–present)

List of head coaches

Key

Coaches

Year-by-year results

See also
 Massachusetts Maritime Buccaneers

Notes

References

External links
 

 
American football teams established in 1973
1973 establishments in Massachusetts